The 2010 New South Wales Swifts season saw New South Wales Swifts compete in the 2010 ANZ Championship. Swifts went through the entire regular season home and away undefeated, winning 13 consecutive matches and finishing as minor premiers. They were the first team in the history of the ANZ Championship to do this. However they subsequently lost both the major semi-final and the preliminary final to Adelaide Thunderbirds and Waikato Bay of Plenty Magic respectively and finished the season in third place.

Players

Player movements

2010 roster

Player milestones
 Three players made their ANZ Championship debut for Swifts during the season – Ashleigh Brazill in  Round 4 against Central Pulse, Lara Welham in Round 5 against West Coast Fever and Kristy Durheim in Round 13 against Melbourne Vixens.   
 Catherine Cox celebrated her 200th game in Round 13 against Melbourne Vixens. 
 Susan Pratley played her 100th game in Round 4 against Central Pulse 
 Kimberley Purcell played her 100th game against Adelaide Thunderbirds in the  major semi-final.

Regular season
Swifts went through the entire regular season home and away undefeated, winning 13 consecutive matches and finishing as minor premiers. They were the first team in the history of the ANZ Championship to do this.

Fixtures and results
Round 1

Round 2

Round 3

Round 4

Round 5

Round 6
New South Wales Swifts received a bye.
Round 7

Round 8

Round 9

Round 10

Round 11

Round 12

Round 13

Round 14

Final table

Playoffs

Major semi-final

Preliminary final

Award winners

Swifts awards

Holden Cruze award

References

New South Wales Swifts seasons
New South Wales Swifts